Kid Boots is a musical with a book by William Anthony McGuire and Otto Harbach, music by Harry Tierney, and lyrics by Joseph McCarthy.  The show was staged by Edward Royce.
 
Produced by Florenz Ziegfeld, the Broadway production, opened on December 31, 1923 at the Earl Carroll Theatre and then moved to the Selwyn Theatre, where it ended on February 21, 1925, for a total of 489 performances. The cast starred Eddie Cantor and Mary Eaton, with George Olsen and his orchestra.

The show was billed as “A Musical Comedy of Palm Beach and Golf” and was set at the Everglades Club in Palm Beach, Florida. It was a showcase for Eddie Cantor, who played the caddie master at the swank club.  He gives golf lessons on the side, with crooked balls so the clients need more instruction.  He's also a bootlegger and a busybody.  He can't be fired, however, because he has something on everyone at the club. The most famous song to come out of the show was “Dinah” by Sam M. Lewis, Joe Young and Harry Akst, added to the finale during the run for Eddie. The song later gave vocalist Dinah Shore, discovered by Eddie Cantor in 1940, her stage name and the theme song for her long running radio and television shows.

The New York Times reported that on closing night, "[j]ust before the finale, George Olsen's band marched down the aisle and serenaded the company, ending with 'Auld Lang Syne.' "

Film versions
During the run in New York City, inventor Lee DeForest filmed Cantor in the DeForest Phonofilm sound-on-film process, in a short film known as A Few Moments With Eddie Cantor, Star of "Kid Boots". In 1926, Paramount Pictures released a feature film version directed by Frank Tuttle, and starring Cantor, Clara Bow, and Billie Dove.

Songs

Act I      
 A Day at the Club
 The Social Observer
 When Your Heart's in the Game
 Keep Your Eye on the Ball
 The Same Old Way
 Someone Loves You after All (The Rain Song)
 The Intruder Dance
 We've Got to Have More
 Polly Put the Kettle On
 Let's Do and Say We Didn't (Let's Don't and Say We Did)
 In the Swim at Miami
 Along the Old Lake Trail
 On With the Game

Act II      
 (Since Ma Is Playing) Mah Jong (by Billy Rose and Con Conrad)
 Bet on the One You Fancy
 I'm In My Glory
 Play Fair, Man!
 Win for Me
 The Cake Eater's Ball
 Down ‘Round the 19th Hole
 En Route
 When the Cocoanuts Call
 In the Rough
 That’s All There Is

Also interpolated into the show:
 If You Do What You Do (by Roy Turk, Lou Handman and Eddie Cantor)
 He’s the Hottest Man in Town (by Owen Murphy and Jay Gorney)
 Alabamy Bound (words by Bud DeSylva and Bud Green, music by Ray Henderson)
 Dinah (by Sam M. Lewis, Joe Young and Harry Akst)

See also
A Few Moments With Eddie Cantor, Star of "Kid Boots" (1923) short film made in the sound-on-film Phonofilm process, with Cantor performing an excerpt of Kid Boots

References

External links
 Kid Boots at Internet Broadway Database
 A Few Moments With Eddie Cantor, Star of 'Kid Boots' (1923) at IMDB
 Kid Boots (1926 film version) at IMDB

1923 musicals
Broadway musicals
Musicals set in the Roaring Twenties
Musicals by Otto Harbach